Marlon Taylor (born August 16, 1997) is an American professional basketball player who last played for the London Lightning of the National Basketball League of Canada (NBLC). He played college basketball for the Panola Ponies and LSU Tigers.

High school career
Taylor attended Mount Vernon and had a prep school year at (now defunct) Forest Trail Academy in Kernersville, North Carolina. At Mount Vernon, he averaged 14 points and 9 rebounds and help his team reach a 19–4 record and the New York Section I Class AA state championships.

College career
Taylor attended Panola his first two years. In his freshman year, the team went 26–9 and advanced to the second round of the NJCAA national tournament for the first time since 1979 after winning the Region 14 tournament and in his sophomore year, he averaged 17.0 points, 9.5 rebounds and 1.8 assists as Panola posted a 20–12 record and advanced to the NJCAA Region 14 Tournament quarterfinals.

In his junior year, Taylor transferred to LSU and started 24 games, averaging 6.7 points and 3.6 rebounds. In his senior season, he had surgery in his left leg, limiting him to 21 games in which he averaged 5.9 points and 4.1 rebounds in 23.2 minutes. However, his final LSU game was his best, scoring 30 points while making 10-of-17 field goals, with three treys in a 94–64 win at home against Georgia.

Professional career
After going undrafted in the 2020 NBA draft, Taylor signed on November 18, 2020, an Exhibit 10 deal with the Washington Wizards, but was waived on December 18 after one preseason game. On January 12, 2021, he signed as a flex-affiliate player with the Erie BayHawks of the NBA G League after the Capital City Go-Go withdrew for the COVID-19 pandemic. In 6 regular season games, he averaged 2.0 points, 1.4 rebounds and 0.5 assists in 10.1 minutes and in his only playoff game, he scored 9 points from the bench in a 110-139 loss to the Lakeland Magic.

In August 2021, Taylor signed with the Leones de Santo Domingo of the Liga Nacional de Baloncesto.

On October 28, 2021, Taylor signed with the Oklahoma City Blue. However, he was waived on November 2. On January 6, 2022, Taylor signed with London Lightning but was waived on March 10.

Personal life
Taylor is the son of Zenchia Crenshaw and has a younger brother and a younger sister. He majored in sport administration.

References

External links
LSU Tigers bio
Panola Ponies bio
RealGM.com profile

1997 births
Living people
American men's basketball players
American expatriate basketball people in Canada
American expatriate basketball people in the Dominican Republic
Basketball players from New York (state)
Erie BayHawks (2019–2021) players
Guards (basketball)
London Lightning players
Junior college men's basketball players in the United States
LSU Tigers basketball players
Panola College alumni
People from Mount Vernon, New York